Lioglyphostoma woodringi is a species of sea snail, a marine gastropod mollusk in the family Pseudomelatomidae, the turrids and allies.

Description
The length of the shell attains 9 mm.

Distribution
This marine species occurs off Louisiana, USA.

References

 Fargo, William G. The Pliocene Turridae of Saint Petersburg, Florida. 1953. in Olsson, A. A. "Pliocene Mollusca of southern Florida with special chapters by WG Fargo and HA Pilsbry" Acad. Nat. Sci. Philadelphia. 1953.

External links
 Rosenberg G., Moretzsohn F. & García E. F. (2009). Gastropoda (Mollusca) of the Gulf of Mexico, Pp. 579–699 in Felder, D.L. and D.K. Camp (eds.), Gulf of Mexico–Origins, Waters, and Biota. Biodiversity. Texas A&M Press, College Station, Texas

woodringi
Gastropods described in 1953